XHGQ-FM/XEGQ-AM is a radio station on 92.5 FM and 1000 AM in Los Reyes, Michoacán. It carries La Raza grupera format.

History

XEGQ-AM received its concession on June 6, 1975. It was owned by Gilberto Hossfeldt Díaz broadcast with 1,000 watts on 1530 kHz.

In 2008, XEGQ moved to 1000 kHz and raised its power to 3.5 kW.

XEGQ received approval to migrate to FM in 2011. The IFT assessed a continuity obligation in 2014, requiring the AM to remain on the air to serve listeners who otherwise had no radio service.

XHGQ-FM was sold to Tremor Comunicaciones, S.A. de C.V. effective December 12, 2018.

References

External links
La Raza 92.5 Los Reyes Facebook

Radio stations in Michoacán
Radio stations in Mexico with continuity obligations